Jama Ko is the third studio album from Malian musician Bassekou Kouyate and his band Ngoni Ba. It was released in April 2013 by Out Here Records.

The first single "Jama Ko" was released on October 22, 2012.

Track listing

References

External links

Jama Ko at iTunes.com
Jama Ko at Out Here Records

2013 albums
Bassekou Kouyaté albums